Mahendar Misir (16 March 1865  26 October 1946) was an Indian Bhojpuri poet who is also called "purbiya samrat" (The Master Of Purbi). He has written Thousands of Purbi Songs.

Life 
Misir was born on 16 March 1865 at Mishrawalia in Chhapra Bihar.

Works 
 Mahendra Mangal
 Mahendra Manjari
 Mahendra Binod
 Mahendra Diwakar
 Mahendra Prabhakar
 Mahendra Ratnawali
 Mahendra Kusumawali
 Mahendra Mayank
 Apurva  Ramayan
 Bhagwat Dasam Skandh
 Krishna Gitawali

References 

Poets from Bihar
People from Chhapra
1886 births
1946 deaths